Hamilton Historic District may refer to:

in the United States
(by state)
 Hamilton Historic District (Carnesville, Georgia), listed on the NRHP in Franklin County, Georgia
 Hamilton Historic District (Hamilton, Massachusetts), NRHP-listed
 Hamilton Historic District (Hamilton, North Carolina), listed on the NRHP in Martin County, North Carolina
 Hamilton Historic Civic Center, Hamilton, Ohio, NRHP-listed
 Fort Hamilton Historic District, Newport, Rhode Island, NRHP-listed
 Hamilton Historic District (Cedarburg, Wisconsin), listed on the NRHP in Ozaukee County, Wisconsin